{{Infobox Christian denomination
| icon                = Nasrani_cross.jpg
| icon_width          = 200px
| icon_alt            =
| name                = Malankara Church
| image               =
| imagewidth          =  
| alt                 = 
| caption             = 
| abbreviation        = 
| type                = Eastern Christian
| main_classification = Oriental Orthodox, Eastern Protestant, Oriental Catholic
| theology            = Miaphysitism,Diophysitism,Reformed
| polity              = Episcopal
| governance          =
| structure           =
| leader_title1       = Metropolitan Bishop
| leader_name1        = Malankara Metropolitan
| division_type       = Sub-divisions
| division            = Syro-Malankara Catholic ChurchMalankara Jacobite Syrian Orthodox ChurchMalabar Independent Syrian ChurchMar Thoma Syrian ChurchMalankara Orthodox Syrian Church
| associations        = 
| area                = Kerala, India
| language            = Suriyani Malayalam, Classical Syriac, Malayalam
| liturgy             = Antiochian Rite- Liturgy of Saint James 
| headquarters        = Pazhaya Seminary
| founder             = Thomas the Apostle  as per tradition.
| founded_date        = 52 AD (tradition) 1665 
|separated_from=Church of the East| branched_from       = Saint Thomas Christians{{efn|<ref>{{cite book|quote=The community of the St Thomas Christians was now divided into two: one group known as the Roman Catholic Syrians/RCSC' remained in the new communion with the Western Church and in obedience to the Pope whose authority they recognized in the archbishop of Goa. The 'Malankara Nazranies' stayed with Native head Mar Thoma I and eventually started relation with the West Syrian Church of Antioch|page=79|first1=Leonard|last1=Fernando|first2= G. |last2= Gispert-Sauch|year=2004|isbn=9780670057696|url=https://books.google.com/books?=7dgYjLCSa0wC&pg=PA79|title=Christianity in India: Two Thousand Years of Faith}}</ref>}}
| separations         = 
| merger              =
| merged_into         = Oriental Orthodox Communion,Anglican Communion,Catholic Communion
| defunct             =
| members             = 
| logo                =}}

The Malankara Church, also known as Puthenkur and more popularly as Jacobite Syrians, is the historic unified body of West Syriac Saint Thomas Christian denominations which claim ultimate origins from the missions of Thomas the Apostle. This community, under the leadership of Thoma I, opposed the Padroado Jesuits as well as the Propaganda Carmelites of the Latin Church, following the historical Coonan Cross Oath of 1653. The Malankara Church's modern-day descendants include the Jacobite Syrian Christian Church, the Malankara Orthodox Syrian Church, the Malankara Marthoma Syrian Church, the Malabar Independent Syrian Church, the Syro-Malankara Catholic Church and the Saint Thomas Anglicans of the Church of South India.

Early history of Christianity in India

Ecclesiastical Communion

Historically, Malabar traded frequently with the nations of the Middle East, and traders from Egypt, Persia, and the Levant frequently visited Malabar for spices. These groups included Arabs, Jews and also Christians, and the Christians who visited here maintained contact with the Malankara Church. As such the Church in India was in ecclesiastical communion with the Church of the East, otherwise called the Persian church. The Malankara Church was headed by a Metropolitan consecrated from the Persian Church and ordinary administration of the Church was vested upon a local, dynastic archdeacon, who was referred to as the Head of the Malankara Christian community. (Archdeacon is the highest rank for a cleric in the Church of the East after the rank of bishop.)

Cheppeds: Collection of deeds on copper plates
The Rulers of Kerala, in appreciation for their assistance, gave to the Malankara Nazranis, three deeds on copper plates. They gave the Nasranis various rights and privileges which were written on copper plates. These are known as Cheppeds, Royal Grants, Sasanam etc.Thomas of Cana copper plates: Dated between 345 and 811 AD, Thomas of Cana (Knai Thoma), a merchant from Persian Mesopotamia, was granted a deed of socio-economic rights known today as the Thomas of Cana copper plates by the Chera Dynasty. Thoma's plates were recorded and translated in the 16th and 17th century by Portuguese officials. The plates are later noted to have disappeared while in the possession of the Portuguese and remain lost. Tharissa palli Deed I: In 849 AD, Perumal Sthanu Ravi Gupta (844–885) gave a deed to Isodatta Virai for Tharissa Palli (church) at Curakkeni Kollam. According to historians, this is the first deed in Kerala that gives the exact date.Tharissa palli Deed II: Continuation of the above, given after 849 AD.Iravi Corttan Deed: In 1225 AD, Sri Vira Raghava Chakravarti gave a deed to Iravi Corttan (Eravi Karthan) of Mahadevarpattanam in 774. Two Brahmin families are witness to this deed showing that Brahmins were in Kerala by the 8th century.

These plates detail privileges awarded to the community by the then rulers. These influenced the development of the social structure in Kerala and privileges, rules for the communities. These are considered as one of the most important legal documents in the history of Kerala.
Three of these are still in the Orthodox Theological Seminary (Old Seminary) in Kottayam and two are at the Mar Thoma Church Headquarters in Tiruvalla.

Archdeacons
The position of archdeacon–the highest for clergy who are not a bishop–had great importance in the church of India in the centuries leading up to the formation of an independent Malankara Church. Though technically subordinate to the metropolitan, the archdeacon wielded great ecclesiastical and secular power, to the extent that he was considered the secular leader of the community and served as effective head of the Indian Church in times when the province was absent a bishop. Unlike the metropolitan, who was evidently always an East Syriac sent by the patriarch, the archdeacon was a native Saint Thomas Christian. In the documented period, the position was evidently hereditary, belonging to the Pakalomattam family, who claimed a privileged connection to Thomas the Apostle.Vadakkekara, pp. 271–272.

Details on the archidiaconate prior to the arrival of the Portuguese are elusive, but Patriarch Timothy I (780–823) called the Archdeacon of India the "head of the faithful in India", implying an elevated status by at least that time. In the recorded period of its history, the office of archdeacon was substantially different in India than in the rest of the Church of the East or other Christian churches. In the broader Church of the East, each bishop was attended by an archdeacon, but in India, there was only ever one archdeacon, even when the province had multiple bishops serving it.

Following the collapse of the Church of the East's hierarchy in most of Asia in the 14th century, India was effectively cut off from the church's heartland in Mesopotamia and formal contact was severed. By the late 15th century India had had no metropolitan for several generations, and the authority traditionally associated with him had been vested in the archdeacon. In 1491, the archdeacon sent envoys to the Patriarch of the Church of the East, as well as to the Coptic Pope of Alexandria and to the Syriac Orthodox Patriarch of Antioch, requesting a new bishop for India. The Patriarch of the Church of the East Shemʿon IV Basidi responded by consecrating two bishops, Thoma and Yuhanon, and dispatching them to India. These bishops helped rebuild the ecclesiastical infrastructure and reestablish fraternal ties with the patriarchate, but the years of separation had greatly affected the structure of the Indian church. Though receiving utmost respect, the metropolitan was treated as the spiritual authority in his own diocese; the Archdeacon was firmly established as the real power in the Malankara community.

Arrival of the Portuguese

At the time the Portuguese arrived in India in 1498, the Saint Thomas Christians were in a difficult position. Though prosperous owing to their large stake in the spice trade and protected by a formidable militia, the tumultuous political climate of the time had placed the small community under pressure from the forces of the powerful rajas of Calicut, Cochin, and the various smaller kingdoms in the area. When the Portuguese under Vasco da Gama arrived on the South Indian coast, the leaders of the Saint Thomas community greeted them and proffered a formal alliance to their fellow Christians. The Portuguese, who had keen interest in implanting themselves in the spice trade and in expanding the domain of their bellicose form of Christianity, jumped at this opportunity.

The Portuguese brought to India a particularly militant brand of Christianity, the product of several centuries of struggle during the Reconquista, which they hoped to spread across the world. Facilitating this objective was the Padroado Real, a series of treaties and decrees in which the Pope conferred upon the Portuguese government certain authority in ecclesiastical matters in the foreign territories they conquered. Upon reaching India the Portuguese quickly ensconced themselves in Goa and established a church hierarchy; soon they set themselves to bringing the native Christians under their dominion. Towards this goal, the colonial establishment felt it necessary to conduct the Saint Thomas Christians fully into the Latin Church, both in bringing them into conformity with Latin church customs and in subjecting them to the authority of the Archbishop of Goa.

Following the death of Metropolitan Mar Jacob in 1552, the Portuguese became more aggressive in their efforts to subjugate the Saint Thomas Christians. Protests on the part of the natives were frustrated by events back in the Church of the East's Mesopotamian heartland, which left them devoid of consistent leadership. In 1552, the year of Jacob's death, a schism in the Church of the East resulted in there being two rival patriarchates, one of which entered into communion with the Catholic Church, and the other of which remained independent. At different times both patriarchs sent bishops to India, but the Portuguese were consistently able to outmaneuver the newcomers or else convert them to Latin Catholicism outright. In 1575 the Padroado declared that neither patriarch could appoint prelates to the community without Portuguese consent, thereby cutting the Thomas Christians off from their hierarchy.

By 1599 the last Metropolitan, Abraham, had died, and the Archbishop of Goa, Aleixo de Menezes, had secured the submission of the young Archdeacon George, the highest remaining representative of the native church hierarchy. That year Menezes convened the Synod of Diamper, which instituted a number of structural and liturgical reforms to the Indian church. At the synod, the parishes were brought directly under the Archbishop's authority, certain "superstitious" customs were anathematized, and the traditional variant of the East Syriac Rite, was purged of elements unacceptable by the Latin standards. Though the Saint Thomas Christians were now formally part of the Catholic Church, the conduct of the Portuguese over the next decades fueled resentment in parts of the community, ultimately leading to open resistance.

Coonan Cross and the independent church

Over the next several decades, tensions seethed between the Latin prelates and what remained of the native hierarchy. This came to a head in 1641 with the ascension of two new protagonists on either side of the contention: Francis Garcia, the new Archbishop of Kodungalloor, and Archdeacon Thomas, the nephew and successor to Archdeacon George. In 1652, the escalating situation was further complicated by the arrival in India of a mysterious figure named Ahatallah.Neill 2004, p. 316.

Ahatallah arrived in Mylapore in 1652, claiming to be the rightful Patriarch of Antioch who had been sent by the Catholic pope to serve as "Patriarch of the Whole of India and of China". Ahatallah's true biography is obscure, but some details have been established. He appears to have been a Syriac Orthodox Bishop of Damascus who converted to Catholicism and went to Rome in 1632. He then returned to Syria in order to bring the Syriac Orthodox Patriarch Ignatius Hidayat Allah into communion with Rome. He had not accomplished this by the time Hidayat Allah died in 1639, after which point Ahatallah began claiming he was Hidayat Allah's rightful successor. In 1646, he was in Egypt at the court of the Coptic Pope Mark VI, who dispatched him to India in 1652, evidently in response to a request for aid from Archdeacon Thomas. Reckoning him an impostor, the Portuguese arrested him, but allowed him to meet with members of the Saint Thomas Christian clergy, whom he impressed greatly. The Portuguese put him on a ship bound for Cochin and Goa, and Archdeacon Thomas led his militia to Cochin demanding to meet with the Patriarch. The Portuguese refused, asserting that he was a dangerous invader and that the ship had already sailed on to Goa.

Ahatallah was never heard from again in India, and rumours soon spread that Archbishop Garcia had disposed of him before he ever reached Goa. Contemporary accounts allege that he was drowned in Cochin harbour, or even that the Portuguese burned him at the stake.Frykenberg, p. 368. In reality, it appears that Ahatallah did in fact reach Goa, from whence he was sent on to Europe, but he evidently died in Paris before reaching Rome where his case was to be heard. In any event, Garcia's dismissiveness towards the Saint Thomas Christians' appeals only embittered the community further.

This was the last straw for the Saint Thomas Christians, and in 1653, Thomas and representatives of the community met at the Church of Our Lady in Mattancherry to take bold action. In a great ceremony before a crucifix and lighted candles, they swore a solemn oath that they would never obey Garcia or the Portuguese again, and that they accepted only the Archdeacon as their shepherd. The Malankara Church and all its successor churches regard this declaration, known as the Coonan Cross Oath (Malayalam: കൂനൻ കുരിശു സത്യം).

Later development

The oppressive rule of the Portuguese padroado provoked a violent reaction on the part of the indigenous Christian community.  The first solemn protest took place in 1653, known as the Coonan Kurishu Satyam (Coonan Cross Oath). Under the leadership of Archdeacon Thoma, the St. Thomas Christians publicly took an oath in Mattancherry, Cochin, that they would not obey the Portuguese Catholic bishops and the Jesuit missionaries. Unfortunately there was no Metropolitan present in the Malankara Church at that time. Hence in the same year, at Alangad, Archdeacon Thoma was ordained, by the laying on of hands of twelve priests, as the first known indigenous Metropolitan of Kerala, under the name Thoma I. The Portuguese missionaries attempted for reconciliation with Saint Thomas Christians but was not successful. Later Pope Alexander VII sent the Syrian bishop Joseph Sebastiani at the head of a Carmelite delegation who succeeded in convincing majority of Saint Thomas Christians, including Palliveettil Chandy Kathanar and Kadavil Chandy Kathanar. The Catholic faction constantly challenged the legitimacy of the consecration of Archdeacon as Metropolitan by priests. The faction that was led by Palliveettil Chandy, cousin of Thoma I, who was consecrated as a bishop in 1663 by Carmelite missionaries of the Catholic Church. He was supported by other prominent Saint Thomas Christian leaders including Kadavil Chandy Kathanar and Vengūr Givargis Kathanar. This made it essential to rectify the illegitimacy of the consecration of Archdeacon as Metropolitan. Episcopal consecration of Thoma I as a Bishop was regularized in 1665 by Gregorios Abdal Jaleel Jerusalem Bishop of Syriac Orthodox Church.  This led to the first permanent split in the Saint Thomas Christian community. Thereafter, the faction affiliated with the Catholic Church under Parambil Mar Chandy was designated the Pazhayakoottukar, or "Old Allegiance", while the branch affiliated with Mar Thoma was called the Puthenkoottukar, or "New Allegiance".Frykenberg, p. 361.Chaput, pp. 7–8. These appellations have been somewhat controversial, as both groups considered themselves the true heirs to the Saint Thomas tradition.

Thoma I with 32 churches (out of 116 total churches) and their congregations were the body from which the Malankara Syrian Puthenkūr Churches originated. In 1665, Gregorios Abdul Jaleel, a Bishop sent by the Syriac Orthodox Patriarch of Antioch, arrived in India, and the Saint Thomas Christians under the leadership of the Archdeacon welcomed him.Dr. Thekkedath, History of Christianity in India" The Gregorios Abdal Jaleel regularised the consecration of Archdeacon as Metropolitan of the Syriac Orthodox Church as per the apostolic standards of Kaiveppu (traditional legitimate way of laying hands by a valid Bishop). The 18th century saw the gradual introduction of West Syriac liturgy and script to the Malabar Coast, a process that continued through the 19th century.

The Syriac Orthodox Communion

The arrival of Mar Gregorios in 1665, marked the introduction of Oriental Orthodoxy in India through the Malankara Church and valid bishopric of Syriac Orthodox Church in India.

Letter from Dionysious Punnathara (a nineteenth century prelate of the Malankara Syrian Church) addressed to the head of the Anglican Church Missionary Society, as translated from the Syriac original:
In the Name of the Eternal and Necessary Existence, the Almighty. Mar Dionysius, Metropolitan of the Jacobite-Syrians in Malabar, subject to the authority of our Father, Mar Ignatius, Patriarch, who presides in the Apostolic See of Antioch of Syria, beloved of the Messiah. Love from Christ, and from the People of all the Churches, to Lord Gambier, the illustrious, honour able, and renowned President...We, who are called Syrian-Jacobites, and reside in the land of Malabar, even from the times of Mar Thomas, the holy Apostle, until the wall of Cochin was taken in the reign of King Purgis, kept the True Faith according to the manner of the Syrian Jacobites, of real glory, without division or confusion. But, by the power of the Franks, our Jacobite Syrian Fathers and Leaders were prohibited from coming from Antioch: and, because we had no Leader and Head, we were like Sheep without a Shepherd; or, like Orphans and Widows, oppressed in spirit, without support or help.In the year of our Lord 1653, came our Spiritual Father, Mar Ignatius, the Patriarch, from Antioch to Malabar....Again, in the year of our Lord 1753, came to us some holy Jacobite Syrian Fathers from Antioch, who turned us to our true ancient faith, and set up a High Priest for us.

In 1912, a Catholicate was instituted in Malankara by the Syriac orthodox Patriarch Abdul Masih, thereby starting a century of legal proceedings between factions of the church which supported the Catholicate, and those who opposed it on behalf of the claims that, the Abdul Masih was excommunicated, Later Syriac Orthodox Church established Canonical Catholicate / Maphrianate of the East in India renamed to Catholicos of India of the Jacobite Syriac Orthodox Church.

 Further history 

In 1665, Gregorios Abdul Jaleel, sent from Patriarch Ignatius Abdulmasih I introduced West Syriac Rite in India. By 1809, the Jacobite Syrians fully incorporated the Antiochian Syriac Rite liturgy after the assembly of parish representatives met at Kandanad, Kerala and resolved to fully implement the move to West Syriac Rite through the declaration Kandanad Padiyola, which had been already partially implemented by the same assembly in 1789 at Puthiyacavu.

The church of Saint Thomas Christians constituted a single church until the 16th century. It formed the community of the East Syriac Eccesiastical Province of India. Later some rifts erupted in their church due to the colonization of India by the Portuguese padroado Latin Catholic missionaries. After the Synod of Diamper, their Church was forcibly merged into the Latin Catholic Church and their eccesiastical province of India was downgraded to become a suffragan see of the newly erected Archdiocese of Goa, administered by Latin Padroado. Thus, the Archdiocese of Cranganore, the most ancient episcopal see in India was deprived of its all-India jurisdiction and was made an inferior to the Archdiocese of Goa, that was a product of the Portuguese colonialism in the sixteenth century. Although the metropolitan status was soon restored, the colonial subjugation continued. In 1653, as a move for independence, the Saint Thomas Christians made the Coonan Cross Oath against the oppressive Latin Catholic hierarchy. The Pope responded to the issue by sending Propaganda Carmelite missionaries, assigning them the responsibility for reunification. This eventually culminated in the gradual schism among the Christians, with one faction reuniting with the Catholic Church and the other faction remaining steadfast against the Latin missionaries. The former faction came to known as Paḻayakūr and latter, led by Thoma I, came to be known as Puthenkūr. Thoma I was regularised as a canonical bishop in 1665 by Archbishop Gregorios Abdul Jaleel of the Syriac Orthodox Church and thus the Puthenkūr, gradually adopted the Miaphysite christology and affiliated themselves to the Oriental Orthodox Communion. In this process, the traditional Persian liturgy of the erstwhile Church of the East in India was replaced among them and this transformation was completed by the 19th century. The Paḻayakūr constitute the contemporary Syro-Malabar Church and the Chaldean Syrian Church. The former is an Eastern Catholic Church and it forms the major part of the Pazhayakūr while the latter is in communion with the Assyrian Church of the East since the late 19th century. The Chaldean Syrian Church thus represents the continuation of the traditional pre-Portuguese Church of the East in India.

Disputes and Court Cases
Later, a number of splits happened among the Jacobite Syrians due to the influence of foreign missionaries and internal conflicts. In 1772, Baselios Shakrallah, a Syriac Orthodox maphrian, consecrated Kattumangatt Abraham Mar Koorilos  as the Metropolitan against Dionysius I. Abraham Mar Koorilos I led the faction that eventually became the Malabar Independent Syrian Church.Vadakkekara, p. 92. In the 19th century, a reform movement inspired by British missionaries led to the formation of the independent Mar Thoma Syrian Church under the leadership of the then Malankara Metropolitan, Mathews Mar Athanasius. Meanwhile, the majority of the members of the church, resisted the movement and strengthened their affiliation to the Syriac Orthodox Church of Antioch at the Mulanthuruthy Synod in 1876. They were led by Pulikkootil Joseph Mar Dionysios, who was consecrated by Patriarch Ignatius Peter III. In 1875, Patriarch Ignatius Peter IV excommunicated Mathews Athanasius, Thomas Athanasius and their followers from the Malankara Church. The British colonial administration abstained from extending their crucial endorsement to any one faction, thereby disengaging themselves from local church matters. Thus, the rival parties had to settle their disputes, entirely by means of court litigations.

Dionysious V and his supporters filed a case on 4 March 1879. (Case O.S. No. 439 of 1054) demanding the possession of the seminary and the control of assets of the Church. Thomas Athanasius was then the Metropolitan.

During the course of this litigation (1879–1889), answering a question Thomas Athanasius Metropolitan said,

A meeting was convened by the Maharaja of Travancore, before the final verdict was given, Athanasius testified that,

The final verdict which came on 12 July 1889 from the Royal Court of Travancore, upheld the conservative position on the Syriac Orthodox Patriarchate of Antioch, as being the only competent ecclesiastical authority historically authorized to ordain and appoint bishops to the Malankara Metropolitan. The ruling declared Dionysious V the rightful Malankara Metropolitan owing to his loyalty to the Antiochian patriarchate known as Jacobite Syrian Christian Church wherefrom he received direct consecration and his acceptance by the majority of Malankara Christians. The judgement also dismissed all claims of the reformists and their leader Thomas Athanasius to the Metropolitanate or its assets. They separated and established the Reformed Mar Thoma Syrian Church.

However this faction underwent a further split in 1912 due to internal disputes and the question of autonomy.Gregorios & Roberson, p. 285. The faction that supported the Patriarch of Antioch was known as Bava Kakshi (Patriarch faction) and those who supported Dionysios VI, the then Malankara Metropolitan, came to be called Methran Kakshi (bishop faction). The former came to be known as the Malankara Orthodox Syrian Church and the latter, initially known as the Malankara Syrian Orthodox Church, adopted the title Jacobite Syrian Christian Church. On 3 July 2017, the Supreme Court of India passed a judgement in favor of the Malankara Orthodox Syrian Church on the question of authority and dispute among the two factions.

 Modern descendants 
The modern-day descendants of the Malankara Church are:
Syro-Malankara Catholic Church: an autonomous sui iuris Eastern Catholic particular church, in full communion with the Holy See and the worldwide Catholic Church, with self-governance under the Code of Canons of the Eastern Churches.
Jacobite Syrian Christian Church (JSCC): an autonomous oriental orthodox church under the local jurisdiction of the Maphrian / Catholicos as known as Catholicos of India of the Syriac Orthodox Church.
Malankara Orthodox Syrian Church (MOSC): an autonomous and autocephalous oriental orthodox church. Catholicos of the East and Malankara Metropolitan entroned on the apostolic throne of Saint Thomas is the primate of the church.
Malankara Mar Thoma Syrian Church (MTC): an independent and autonomous Oriental Protestant malankara church under the jurisdiction of Marthoma Metropolitan, seated on the Apostolic Throne of Saint Thomas the apostle. The Church also shares communion with the Church of England and its communion.
Malabar Independent Syrian Church: an autonomous and autocephalous church under the jurisdiction of its own independent Metropolitan, also sharing an communion with the Church of England and its communion.
Among these five, only the JSCC form an integral part of the Syriac Orthodox Church of Antioch.

The autocephalous MOSC, also known as the Indian Orthodox Church is one of the member churches of Oriental Orthodox communion. The MTC is an independent Oriental Protestant church that is in communion with the Church of England and its Anglican communion.

Gallery

See also

Pazhaya Seminary Orthodox Theological Seminary, Kottayam
 Malankara Metropolitan
 List of Malankara Metropolitans

Footnotes

Notes

References
 
 
 Fernando, Leonard; Gispert-Sauch, G. (2004). Christianity in India: Two Thousand Years of Faith. Viking.
 Frykenberg, Eric (2008). Christianity in India: from Beginnings to the Present. Oxford. .
 
 Hough, James (1893) "The History of Christianity in India".

 Menachery, G (1973) The St. Thomas Christian Encyclopedia of India, Ed. George Menachery, B.N.K. Press, vol. 2, Lib. Cong. Cat. Card. No. 73-905568 ; B.N.K. Press
 Menachery, G (ed); (1998) "The Indian Church History Classics", Vol.I, The Nazranies, Ollur, 1998. 
 Menachery, G (2010) The St. Thomas Christian Encyclopedia of India, Ed. George Menachery, Ollur, vol. 3, Lib. Cong. Cat. Card. No. 73-905568 ; 680306 India
 Menachery, G (2012) "India's Christian Heritage" The Church History Association of India, Ed. Oberland Snaitang, George Menachery, Dharmaram College, Bangalore

 

 Puthiakunnel, Thomas (1973) "Jewish colonies of India paved the way for St. Thomas", The Saint Thomas Christian Encyclopedia of India'', ed. George Menachery, Vol. II., Trichur.
 Vadakkekara, Benedict (2007). Origin of Christianity in India: a Historiographical Critique. Media House Delhi.

1665 establishments in India
Saint Thomas Christians
Syriac Orthodox Church